Matthew Paul Grove (born May 1963) is a former Conservative Humberside Police and Crime Commissioner.

Career
Grove was the first person to hold the post of Humberside Police and Crime Commissioner, serving between November 2012 and May 2016. He was elected following a closely fought race with Labour's John Prescott. Grove was previously a local councillor in the East Riding of Yorkshire for Mid Holderness.

He lost his seat to the Labour party candidate Keith Hunter in the 5 May 2016 election.

Grove later defected to the Liberal Democrats.

References

External links

1963 births
Living people
Conservative Party (UK) councillors
Members of East Riding County Council
Conservative Party police and crime commissioners
Police and crime commissioners in England
Liberal Democrats (UK) politicians